The 1971 European Weightlifting Championships were held at the Universiada Hall in Sofia, Bulgaria from June 19 to June 27, 1971. This was the 50th edition of the event. There were 123 men in action from 23 nations.

Medal summary
{| 
|-
!colspan=7|52 kg
|-
|Press
| || 112.5 kg
| || 110.0 kg
| || 97.5 kg
|-
|Snatch
| || 97.5 kg
| || 95.0 kg
| || 92.5 kg
|-
|Clean & Jerk
| || 125.0 kg
| || 120.0 kg
| || 120.0 kg
|-bgcolor=#dfefff
|Total
| || 332.5 kg| || 327.5 kg
| || 305.0 kg|-
!colspan=7|56 kg
|-
|Press
| || 125.0 kg
| || 117.5 kg
| || 112.5 kg
|-
|Snatch
| || 105.0 kg
| || 105.0 kg
| || 105.0 kg
|-
|Clean & Jerk
| || 137.5 kg
| || 135.0 kg
| || 132.5 kg
|-bgcolor=#dfefff
|Total| || 367.5 kg
| || 355.0 kg| || 350.0 kg
|-
!colspan=7|60 kg
|-
|Press
| || 130.0 kg
| || 125.0 kg
| || 122.5 kg
|-
|Snatch
| || 122.5 kg
| || 120.0 kg
| || 120.0 kg
|-
|Clean & Jerk
| || 155.0 kg
| || 152.5 kg
| || 147.5 kg
|-bgcolor=#dfefff
|Total
| || 397.5 kg| || 395.0 kg
| || 390.0 kg|-
!colspan=7|67.5 kg
|-
|Press
| || 145.0 kg
| || 145.0 kg
| || 140.0 kg
|-
|Snatch
| || 137.5 kg
| || 125.0 kg
| || 120.0 kg
|-
|Clean & Jerk
| || 170 kg
| || 167.5 kg
| || 157.5 kg
|-bgcolor=#dfefff
|Total| || 450.0 kg
| || 435.0 kg| || 412.5 kg
|-
!colspan=7|75 kg
|-
|Press 
| || 147.5 kg
| || 147.5 kg
| || 145.0 kg
|-
|Snatch
| || 140.0 kg
| || 140.0 kg
| || 137.5 kg
|-
|Clean & Jerk
| || 180.0 kg
| || 177.5 kg
| || 167.5 kg
|-bgcolor=#dfefff
|Total
| || 462.5 kg| || 460.0 kg
| || 452.5 kg|-
!colspan=7|82.5 kg
|-
|Press
| || 165.0 kg
| || 162.5 kg
| || 160.0 kg
|- 
|Snatch
| || 147.5 kg
| || 142.5 kg
| || 140.0 kg
|- 
|Clean & Jerk
| || 187.5 kg
| || 187.5 kg
| || 180.0 kg
|-bgcolor=#dfefff
|Total| || 500.0 kg
| || 490.0 kg| || 465.0 kg
|-
!colspan=7|90 kg
|-
|Press
| || 190.0 kg
| || 182.5 kg
| || 172.5 kg
|-
|Snatch
| || 160.0 kg
| || 155.0 kg
| || 145.0 kg
|-
|Clean & Jerk
| || 205.0 kgWR
| || 200.0 kg
| || 195.0 kg
|-bgcolor=#dfefff
|Total
| || 537.5 kg| || 537.5 kg
| || 512.5 kg|-
!colspan=7|110 kg
|-
|Press
| || 192.5 kg
| || 190.0 kg
| || 187.5 kg
|-
|Snatch
| || 162.5 kg
| || 160.0 kg
| || 160.0 kg
|-
|Clean & Jerk
| || 210.0 kg
| || 205.0 kg
| || 200.0 kg
|-bgcolor=#dfefff
|Total| || 560.0 kg
| || 557.5 kg| || 545.0 kg
|-
!colspan=7|+110 kg
|-
|Press
| || 225.0 kgWR
| || 217.5 kg
| || 212.5 kg
|-
|Snatch
| || 175.0 kg
| || 172.5 kg
| || 170.0 kg
|-
|Clean & Jerk
| || 232.5 kgWR
| || 220.0 kg
| || 215.0 kg
|-bgcolor=#dfefff
|Total
| || 630.0 kgWR| || 607.5 kg
| || 602.5 kg|}

Medal table
Ranking by Big''' (Total result) medals

References
Results (Chidlovski.net)
М. Л. Аптекарь. «Тяжёлая атлетика. Справочник.» — М.: «Физкультура и спорт», 1983. — 416 с. 

European Weightlifting Championships
European Weightlifting Championships
European Weightlifting Championships
International weightlifting competitions hosted by Bulgaria
Sports competitions in Sofia